Two Sisters Lake is a lake located in Newbold, Oneida County, Wisconsin.

References

Lakes of Oneida County, Wisconsin
Lakes of Wisconsin